HMS E42 was a British E-class submarine built by Cammell Laird, Birkenhead. She was launched on 22 October 1915 and commissioned in July 1916. She served during the First World War, hitting with a torpedo the battlecruiser  on 25 April 1918 and making an unsuccessful attack on U-92 on 1 July 1918.  
E42 was sold for scrap at Poole on 6 September 1922.

Design
She was powered by two  Vickers eight-cylinder two-stroke diesel engines and two  electric motors.

E42 was armed with a 12-pounder  QF gun mounted forward of the conning tower. She had five 18-inch (450 mm) torpedo tubes, two in the bow, one either side amidships, and one in the stern; a total of 10 torpedoes were carried.

E-Class submarines had wireless systems with  power ratings; in some submarines, these were later upgraded to  systems by removing a midship torpedo tube. Their maximum design depth was  although in service some reached depths of below . Some submarines contained Fessenden oscillator systems.

Notes

References 
 Koerver, Hans Joachim. Room 40: German Naval Warfare 1914-1918. Vol II., The Fleet in Being. Steinbach, Germany: LIS Reinisch, 2009.
 

 

British E-class submarines of the Royal Navy
Ships built on the River Mersey
1915 ships
World War I submarines of the United Kingdom
Royal Navy ship names